Eschlkam is a municipality in the district of Cham in Bavaria in Germany.

The location is in the Bavarian Bohemian Forest area. The town is located about halfway up a mountain, the Hohenbogen. The town has a border crossing over to the Czech Republic. Many of the farmers rent rooms or suites to vacationers in the summertime. Eschlkam is part of the Natur Park Oberer Bayerisher Wald, Nature Park of the Bohemian Forest.

References

Cham (district)